Wan Zawawi Wan Yusof  (11 April 1949 – 17 November 2017) was a Malaysian footballer. 

A prison officer by profession, as Malaysia football was not professional at the time, Zawawi represented Prison Department, Kelantan FA and Pahang FA during his football career. He also played for Malaysia national team, and competed in the men's tournament at the 1972 Summer Olympics, scoring in the 3-0 win against United States in the group stage.

In 2004, he was inducted in Olympic Council of Malaysia's Hall of Fame for 1972 Summer Olympics football team.

Honours
Kelantan
 Malaysia Cup runner-up: 1970
 Malaysia FAM Cup runner-up: 1971, 1972

Malaysia
 Asian Games Bronze medal: 1974
 Merdeka Cup: 1973, 1974

References

External links
 

1949 births
2017 deaths
Malaysian footballers
Malaysia international footballers
Olympic footballers of Malaysia
Footballers at the 1972 Summer Olympics
Place of birth missing
Association football midfielders
Footballers at the 1974 Asian Games
Medalists at the 1974 Asian Games
Asian Games medalists in football
Asian Games bronze medalists for Malaysia